Lenton "Len" Lapthorne (29 January 1919 – 30 May 1997) was a former Australian rules footballer who played for South Adelaide in the South Australian National Football League (SANFL) between 1937 and 1952.  He was appointed Captain of South Adelaide for two seasons from 1949 to 1950.

References

External links 
Len Lapthorne's profile at AustralianFootball.com

South Adelaide Football Club players
1919 births
1997 deaths
Australian rules footballers from South Australia